Milisav Čamdžija, better known as Milisav the Boatman (Čamdžija), (1785 – 1815) was born in the village of Veliki Borak in the Belgrade nahija in 1785. He got the nickname because as a boatman he regularly transported people across the Sava River. He was among the earliest warriors during the First Serbian Uprising; he died two days after getting mortally wounded in the first battle of the Second Serbian Uprising led by Prince Miloš in 1815.

Biography
Milisav Ivanović, better known as Čamdžija, could trace his family tree following the migration of Arsenije IV Jovanović Šakabenta when they settled in Veliki Borak in the outskirts of Belgrade. Milisav was born in this family of Herzegovinian-Montenegrin origin, in the seventies of the eighteenth century. The household consisted of brothers Milinko, Milan and Petar, with their families. From Milinko's sons Ivanko and Milisav, Ivanković and Čamcić were born a little later, and from the brothers Milan and Petra, Milanović and Petrović were born, also called Žijarski. The family was more engaged in animal husbandry than agriculture, so Milisav's childhood, like most of his peers, was spent in shepherd's obligations. He stood out from other children for his dexterity and agility, and nature gave him a special gift for singing. Almost all the children in this area were educated by priest Sima's father, priest Stanoje or priest Sima in his school for the literacy of young people.

When he grew up, like many of his peers, he set off as a companion to Prince Sima Marković in the cattle trade across the Sava. In Palež (the old name for today's Obrenovac) there was a ferry on Kolubara and a small port. There are loaded Bosnian ships with various goods that the spahis and merchants of Pale took from the Serbian people. Serbs worked on the loading, and it is believed that Milisav also worked on the loading for a while, and he learned to swim well there.

The idea of Austria to prevent the spread of Turkish power was very gladly accepted by the Serbs. Although too young to enlist in the volunteer Freikorps, when the Austrian-Turkish war began, Milisav fought with other Serbs on the side of Austria. In 1788, the battles covered a wide area of Serbia and are remembered as Kočina Krajina. Austria lost this war and immediately withdrew its army over the pontoon bridge on the Sava, which was immediately destroyed. Serious Turkish revenge awaited the Serbs. Old and powerless to save at least a little cattle, they retreated to the dense forests of Rudnik and Medvednik. Most Borčans sought salvation across the Sava River. Arriving on the riverbank, they found a lot of people and a few carriages. Then, Milisav swam across the river Sava and dragged the Turkish deregulation from the other bank. He first transported his Borčans and then the others. On that occasion, Milisav was called Čamdžija and that name will remain with him for the rest of his life.

He excelled in burning Turkish inns (called han), heroism in every battle. From the beginning of the uprising in 1806, he was with Prince Sima Marković. He acquired the rank of captain by training new soldiers in the handling of weapons and military skills.
 
Karađorđe and Milisav Čamdžija led the first attack that freed Belgrade from the Turks.Of all the voivodes Karađorđe had around him while preparing the attack, he chose Čamdžija for his exemplary valor.

Death
When the Second Serbian Uprising under Prince Miloš Obrenović began in 1815, Milisav immediately became involved in the conquest of the village of Palež (today Obrenovac), where he was wounded in 1815. He died two days later. He was buried in his orchard under a walnut tree, next to his brother.

His contemporaries agree that he was a great hero, he did not ask for decorations or titles, he only wanted to see Serbia free. 

The tombstone of Milisav Čamdžija is now a cultural monument.

Sources
 Vasiljević, Radmila (2018), Milisav Chamdzija. Belgrade: Fabula Nostra. p. 3—6. .
 Nedeljković, Milena (2015), Cross in time. Belgrade: Barajevo Cultural Center. p. 153. .
 "Remembering-the-hero-Camdzija-won-Belgrade", novosti.rs/vesti/naslovna. Retrieved January 19, 2019.
 Categories: Died 1815.Participants of the First Serbian UprisingParticipants of the Second Serbian Uprising

References 

1785 births
1815 deaths
First Serbian Uprising
Serbian soldiers
People from Belgrade
Serbian revolutionaries
Austrian soldiers